Cloverland is a neighborhood located on the south side of Houston, Texas, United States.

Cloverland was the home neighborhood for Lil Flip and many other Houston rappers. In 2005, Cloverburger, a hamburger joint in the neighborhood located at 4515 Mowery Road, was the site of the T.I./Lil Flip altercation.

Cloverland neighborhood homes has been built from 1955-1965

Education

Primary and secondary schools

Public schools
Cloverland is served by the Houston ISD.

Cloverland is zoned to:
 Law Elementary School for grades Kindergarten through 5
 Woodson K-8 School for grades 6 through 8
 Worthing High School for grades 9 through 12

Carnegie Vanguard High School an HISD 9-12 magnet, was located near Cloverland before it moved to the Fourth Ward.

KIPP: the Knowledge Is Power Program operates the KIPP Spirit College Preparatory School, a 5th Grade charter school, near Cloverland.

Postal services
The closest United States Postal Service post office is the Martin Luther King Post Office at 9444 Cullen Boulevard, 77051-9998.

Emergency services

Police services
The neighborhood is within the Houston Police Department's Southeast Patrol Division .

The Sunnyside Storefront Station, near Cloverland, is located at 3511 Reed Road .

Fire services
The Houston Fire Department Station 55 Sunnyside is near Cloverland at 11212 Cullen Boulevard at Selinski .

References

See also

Neighborhoods in Houston